The Laurel family is a Filipino family of politicians and entertainers.

List of members

 Jose P. Laurel 
 ∞ married Pacencia Laurel; they had nine children
 Jose Laurel Jr. 
 ∞ married Remedios Lerma
 Jose Macario Laurel IV
 Lally Laurel
 ∞ married Noel Trinidad an actor
 Joel Trinidad
 Salvador Laurel 
 ∞ married Celia Diaz Laurel, they had eight children.
 Cocoy Laurel 
 David Laurel 
 ∞ married Ruby Sanz 
 Denise Laurel, has a son.
 Alejandro
 Iwi Laurel, a singer
 Nicole Laurel Asensio, a singer and actress
 with actress Pilar Pilapil fathered
 Pia Pilapil
  ∞ married Jerry Gonzalo, they have four children.
 Jose S. Laurel III
 ∞ married Beatriz Castillo
 Laurel
 ∞ married Fely Reyes, they had five children; Franco, Rally, Martin, Sandra, Yanah.
 Franco Laurel
 ∞ married Ayen Munji, together they have five children.
 Yanah Laurel, a singer
 Mercedes Laurel
 ∞ married Marquez, they have two children
 Kenji Motoki, model and actor

References 

Laurel family
Show business families of the Philippines